TRPM4-IN-5 is a drug which acts as a moderately potent but highly selective blocker of the TRPM4 ion channel, with an IC50 of 1.5μM. It is protective against glutamate mediated neuronal excitotoxicity.

References 

Carboxylic acids
Amides
Chlorobenzenes